Felix Döring (born 23 February 1991) is a German teacher and politician of the Social Democratic Party (SPD) who has been serving as a member of the Bundestag since 2021.

Political career
Döring was elected directly to the Bundestag in 2021.

In parliament, Döring has been serving on the Committee on Family Affairs, Senior Citizens, Women and Youth.

Within his parliamentary group, Döring belongs to the Parliamentary Left, a left-wing movement.

Other activities
 Education and Science Workers' Union (GEW), Member

References 

Living people
1991 births
People from Giessen
Social Democratic Party of Germany politicians
Members of the Bundestag 2021–2025
21st-century German politicians